Inchanga is a village in KwaZulu-Natal, South Africa, approximately halfway between Durban and Pietermaritzburg.

Schools 
Inchanga has several schools, including Rietvallei Combined School, Siphesihle High School, Inchanga Primary School, Zifikele High School  MbaliYezwe Primary School and KwaXimba Combined School.

History

An alternate route around the ravine made the bridge obsolete in 1892, and a train station was built nearby in 1895. A hotel was built near the train station in 1903, but 20 years later a new rail line was built some distance away and business suffered. Both the hotel and the train station have been restored and are operating in their original function. The station serves as the midpoint on the excursion trips of the Umgeni Steam Railway.

External links
 Inchanga Hotel
 Umgeni Steam Railway

References

Populated places in eThekwini Metropolitan Municipality